Pippal may refer to:

Transliteration of the Punjabi name for the Sacred fig, a tree

People

Eugenie Pippal-Kottnig, an Austrian architect (1921–1998)
Hans Robert Pippal, an Austrian painter (1915–1998)
Martina Pippal, an Austrian art historian and artist (born 1957)